Jürgen Kühl (30 November 1934 – 3 August 2020) was a German sprinter. He competed in the men's 400 metres at the 1956 Summer Olympics.

References

External links
 

1934 births
2020 deaths
Athletes (track and field) at the 1956 Summer Olympics
German male sprinters
Olympic athletes of the United Team of Germany
Place of birth missing